Tanzih is an Islamic religious concept meaning transcendence. In Islamic theology, two opposite terms are attributed to Allah: tanzih and tashbih.
The former means "nearness, closeness, accessibility".
However, the fuller meaning of tanzih is 'declaring incomparability', i.e. affirming Allah's transcendence from humanity. This concept is eternally juxtaposed with Allah's tashbih (closeness, or 'affirming similarity').

The literal meaning of the word is "to declare something pure and free of something else". This definition affirms that Allah cannot be likened to anything: "Nothing is like Him." (Sura 42:11) and reinforces the fundamental, underlying Islamic belief in tawhid.

The Divine Names of Allah associated with tanzih are those that indicate distance, transcendence, awe and fear: King, Avenger, Knowing, Praiseworthy, Slayer, Strong, Abaser and Independent.

References

God in Islam
Islamic terminology
Islamic theology